Fulco VIII, Prince Ruffo di Calabria, 6th Duke of Guardia Lombarda (12 August 1884 – 23 August 1946) was an Italian World War I flying ace and senator of the Kingdom from 1934 until his death. He was the father of Paola, Queen of the Belgians (born Donna Paola Ruffo di Calabria).

Family history
Ademarus Rufus, who died in 1049, held the title of Comes in southern Italy. Siggerio Ruffo became Holy Roman Emperor Frederick II's grand marshal of the Kingdom of Sicily in 1235. After the 14th century, the family divided into two branches Ruffo di Scaletta and the Ruffo di Calabria, the latter to which Fulco belonged.

Fulco was the son of Fulco VII Beniamino Tristano Ruffo di Calabria, 5th Duke of Guardia Lombarda (1848–1901), and Laura Mosselman du Chenoy, a Belgian aristocrat, whose maternal grandfather was Count Jacques André Coghen, Belgium's second finance minister. Beniamino Ruffo di Calabria was the younger brother of the head of the House of Ruffo, Fulco Ruffo di Calabria-Santapau, 10th Principe di Scilla and 2nd Duca di Santa Cristina.

Fulco was made, by decree of 15 March 1928, Prince Ruffo di Calabria, in the Kingdom of Italy. By inheritance he was also the 6th Duke of Guardia Lombarda and 17th Count of Sinopoli. The family Ruffo di Calabria represents one of the most ancient lineages of Italy and includes Cardinal Fabrizio Ruffo. Fulco was related to historically eminent Roman and southern Italian noble families, including the Colonna, Orsini, Pallavicini, Alliata and Rospigliosi.

Early life and prewar military service
Fulco Ruffo di Calabria was born in Naples, Kingdom of Italy on 12 August 1884. He volunteered as a reserve officer's training with the 11th Foggia Light Cavalry Regiment on 22 November 1904. On 31 May 1905, he was promoted to Corporal; on 30 November, he was again promoted, to Sergente. On 20 February 1906, he was commissioned into officers' ranks as a Second lieutenant.

Subsequently, he became deputy director of the Belgian Wegimont shipping company's African station. He returned from Africa as World War I broke out.

World War I service

Ruffo di Calabria returned to military duty before Italy's entry into World War I, and was assigned to the Battaglione Aviatori (which later became the Corpo Aeronautico Militare) on 20 December 1914. After pilot's training, on 28 September 1915, he was posted to the 4a Squadriglia Artiglia, an artillery coordination unit that later morphed into 44a Squadriglia. On 26 January 1916, he moved to 2a Squadriglia (later 42a Squadriglia). He won two Bronze awards of the Medal for Military Valor—in February and April 1916—while still a two-seater pilot with them. His personal emblem was a black skull and crossbones painted on the fuselage of his plane, whether it was his original Nieuport 11s, or his later Nieuport 17 and SPAD VII airplanes.

Ruffo di Calabria underwent further training on Nieuports at Cascina Costa in May 1916. On 26 June, he was assigned to 1a Squadriglia as a fighter pilot. He won his first victory there, shared with Francesco Baracca on 23 August 1916, and had a second one go unconfirmed. His performance was good for a Silver Medal for Military Valor in August, followed by a Bronze in September 1916.

By 16 September, when he shared a victory with Baracca and Luigi Olivari, he was scoring for his new unit, 70a Squadriglia. He ran his score with them to four confirmed and four unconfirmed by 28 February 1917.

In March 1917, he was transferred out of the reserves when he was promoted to Tenente. In May he then switched to flying a Nieuport for 91a Squadriglia. He was awarded both a Silver and a Bronze Medal for Military Valor that same month. His promotion to Capitano came through in August 1917. By that time, his confirmed victories totaled 13. He ended 1917 with his total victories at 16.

Ruffo di Calabria's records for 1918 are incomplete, but credit him with four more victories. On 5 May 1918, he was granted the ultimate Medal of Military Valor, the Gold award. After Baracca's death on 19 June 1918, Fulco assumed command of the renowned "Squadron of Aces". He relinquished command of 91a Squadriglia on 18 September to Ferruccio Ranza, after suffering a nervous breakdown. After recovery, he was handed command of 10th Gruppo, on 23 October 1918, but was shot down by artillery fire near Marano on 29 October 1918. In the end, he shot down 20 enemy airplanes in 53 combats, making him the fifth highest scoring Italian flying ace of World War I.

Post-World War I
On 1 February 1919, the Bongiovanni commission's military intelligence report verified all 20 of Ruffo di Calabria's confirmed victories, though still denying the five that were unconfirmed. Di Calabria remained in the military, though without assignment. By 1925, his main activity was management of his family estates located near Paliano.

In 1934, he was named senator of the kingdom by King Victor Emmanuel III. He also continued in the military, eventually rising to the rank of Tenente Colonello in 1942. Ruffo di Calabria served in the Italian senate until 1944.

During World War II, he was a supporter of the Italian fascist leader Mussolini. He was subsequently convicted postwar by an Italian court for complicity in the crimes of fascism, and that ruling was upheld on 10 January 1946 despite his appeal.

Fulco Ruffo di Calabria died in Ronchi di Apuania, Italy on 23 August 1946.

Awards

Italian awards
 Knight of the Military Order of Savoy ‑ R.D. 10 September 1918
 Gold Medal of Military Valor ‑ D.L. 5 May 1918
 Silver Medal of Military Valor ‑ D.L. 15 March 1917
 Silver Medal of Military Valor (combat merit on the field) - D.L. 20 January 1918
 Bronze Medal of Military Valor ‑ D.L. 15 October 1916
 Bronze Medal of Military Valor ‑ D.L. 24 May 1917
 Bronze Medal of Military Valor - D.L. 10 June 1917.
 Bronze Medal of Military Valor‑ D.L. 16 June 1917
 War Merit Cross - 1918
 Badge for the war effort (with four service stars) - R.D. 21 May 1916
 Commemorative medal of the Italian–Austrian war of 1915–1918 (with four service stars) - (R.D. 29 July 1920)
 Italian World War I Victory Medal - (R.D. 29 July 1920)
 Commemorative Medal for the Unification of Italy (R.D. 19 October 1922)
 Order of the Crown of Italy
 Commander (30 November 1939)
 Officer (22 December 1938)
 Knight (29 January 1929)

International awards
 Knight of the Order of Leopold - Belgium
 Belgian Croix de guerre - 10 March 1917

Personal life and descendants
On 30 June 1919, he married, in Turin, Luisa Gazelli (1896–1989), daughter of Augusto Gazelli dei Conti di Rossana, and of Maria Cristina dei Conti Rignon. Luisa served as a lady-in-waiting to Queen Elena of Italy

They had seven children:

 Maria Cristina Ruffo di Calabria (1920–2003); married Casimiro San Martino d´Aglie dei Marchesi di San Germano in 1940 : Emanuela San Martino d'Agliè; married 1962 Count Ernesto Rossi di Montelera (born 1938) : Lidia Rossi di Montelera (born 1963); married 1990 Count Alexander zu Trauttmansdorff-Weinsberg.
 Maria Cristina Rossi di Montelera (born 1965); married 1994 Baron Hans-Ulrich von Freyberg-Eisenberg-Allmendingen.
 Ginevra Rossi di Montelera (born 1967).
 Antonella Rossi di Montelera (born 1970); married 2003 Count Alois von Waldburg-Zeil.
 Antonella San Martino d'Agliè; married 1970 Count Ippolito Calvi di Bergolo Rocca Saporiti.
 Giovanna San Martino d'Aglie (born 10 April 1945, Campiglione); married 24 May 1974 Campiglione, Italy, Don Alvaro de Orléans-Borbón y Parodi Delfino (son of Infante Alvaro de Orléans-Borbón, Duke of Galliera), divorced with issue in ?
 Nicolo San Martino d'Aglie (born 3 July 1948, Campiglione); married 4 June 1974 Princess Catherine Napoléon (daughter of Louis, Prince Napoléon), divorced without issue in 1982.
Filippo San Martino d'Agile di San Germano (born 24 Septembre 1953, Torino); married 16 November 1984 Cristina Maria Margherita Flesia.
 Laura Ruffo di Calabria (1921–1972);married Bettino, Baron Ricasoli Firidolfi (31st Baron of Brolio) in 1946: four children (Andrea [d. circa 1974], Luisa, Maria Teresa, Francesco, 32nd Baron of Brolio). Fabrizio, Prince Ruffo di Calabria-Santapau (1922–2005); head of the House of Ruffo from 1975:13th Prince of Palazzolo, 14th Prince of Scilla, 7th Duke of Guardia Lombarda, 13th Marquis of Scilla and 18th Count of Sinopoli:his first marriage to Maria Vaciago, had : Don Fulco IX, Prince Ruffo di Calabria (born 29 July 1954); current head of the House of Ruffo di Calabria, married and divorced Melba Vincens Bello; married secondly, in 2005, Luisa Tricarico.
 Augusto Ruffo di Calabria (born 1 October 1955); married Princess Christiana zu Windisch-Graetz in 1980 with issue.
 Imara Ruffo di Calabria (born 7 July 1958); married firstly Uberto Imar Gashe (grandson of Princess Yolanda of Savoy) in 1986; married secondly Baron Marco Tonci Ottieri della Ciaia in 1993.
 Umberto Ruffo di Calabria (born 23 October 1960); married Leontina, Marchesa Pallavicini in 1987.
Don Alessandro Ruffo di Calabria (born 4 November 1964); married Princess Mafalda of Savoy-Aosta in 1994, divorced without issue in 2000.
 Augusto Ruffo di Calabria (1925–1943); killed in battle at sea on 2 November 1943 near Pescara.
 Giovannella Ruffo di Calabria (1927–1941).
 Antonello Ruffo di Calabria (1930–2017);married Rosa Maria Mastrogiovanni Tasca in 1961. Covella Ruffo di Calabria (born 4 February 1962, Rome).
 Lucio Ruffo di Calabria (born 14 April 1964, Rome).
 Domitilla Ruffo di Calabria (born 9 May 1965, Rome); married 16 July 1990 Don Giovanni dei Baroni Porcari Li Destri.
 Claudia Ruffo di Calabria (born 30 August 1969, Rome); married 27 May 1989 Marcello Salom.
 Paola Ruffo di Calabria (born 1937); Queen consort of the Belgians: married to Albert II, King of the Belgians (then Prince of Liège) in 1959.Philippe, King of the Belgians;Married to Mathilde, Countess d'Udekem d'Acoz, 4 children.

Ancestry

Footnotes

Sources 

References
 de Badts de Cugnac, Chantal; Coutant de Saisseval, Guy. Le petit Gotha: Collection Le Petit Gotha. Le Petit Gotha, 2002. , 9782950797438.
 Ehrenkrook, Hans Friedrich von; Hueck, Walter von; Franke, Christoph; Strachwitz von Groß-Zauche u. C. Moritz; editors. Genealogisches Handbuch der Fürstlichen Häuser. Band XVI (2001), Volume 124. Walter von Hueck, Christoph Franke, Moritz. Starke, 2001. , 9783798008243.
 Norman Franks, Russell Guest, Gregory Alegi. Above the War Fronts: The British Two-seater Bomber Pilot and Observer Aces, the British Two-seater Fighter Observer Aces, and the Belgian, Italian, Austro-Hungarian and Russian Fighter Aces, 1914–1918: Volume 4 of Fighting Airmen of WWI Series: Volume 4 of Air Aces of WWI. Grub Street, 1997. .
 Franks, Norman. Nieuport Aces of World War 1. Osprey Publishing, 2000. , .
 Guttman, Jon. SPAD XII/XIII Aces of World War I.'' Osprey Publishing, 2002. , 9781841763163.

External links

 Photo of Ruffo di Calabria's restored Spad VII fighter 

1884 births
1946 deaths
Military personnel from Naples
People of Calabrian descent
Nobility from Naples
Italian World War I flying aces
Recipients of the Gold Medal of Military Valor
Recipients of the Silver Medal of Military Valor
Recipients of the Bronze Medal of Military Valor
Members of the Senate of the Kingdom of Italy
20th-century Italian politicians
Guardia Lombardi
Fulco